Edward Renehan may refer to:
 Edward J. Renehan Jr., American writer and musician
 Edward Joseph Renehan Sr., American banker